Alexander was built in the United States in 1811 and captured as a prize during the War of 1812, or built in 1813 in Halifax. She first appeared in Lloyd's Register for 1815 with Hamilton, master, M'Dowell, owner, and trade Greenock-Newfoundland.

Under the command of William Hamilton, she sailed from Ireland on 4 November 1815, and arrived at Port Jackson on 4 April 1816. She transported 84 female convicts, three of whom died on the voyage.

Alexander left Port Jackson on 23 June bound for England.

On 4 November 1821 Alexander, Fryer, master, arrived at Liverpool from Demerara. She was on shore at Bootle Bay. By 8 November she had been gotten off.

In 1831 Alexander sailed to Van Diemen's Land and New South Wales. In 1833 she sailed from New South Wales to New Zealand. Later, she sailed to Trinidad.

The volume of Lloyd's Register for 1833 has the first mention of Alexander being of 229 tons (bm), and having been launched in 1813 at Halifax, Nova Scotia. (This may have been the source of the information in Hackman.) Subsequent volumes to 1839 carry only minimal information and there is no ship arrival and departure data for Alexander, Green, master, after mid-1833.

Citations and references
Citations

References

See also
List of ships captured in the 19th century
Bibliography of early American naval history

1811 ships
Ships built in the United States
Convict ships to New South Wales
Captured ships
Age of Sail merchant ships
Merchant ships of the United Kingdom